Marco Galiazzo (born 7 May 1983, in Padova) is an athlete from Italy.  He competes in archery for C.S. Aeronautica Militare, and is a former world number one.  He was the first Olympic champion in the Italian archery history, winner of the gold medal in men's individual competition at Olympic Games – Athens 2004 and gold medal in team competition at the Olympic Games – London 2012 (in the same event he won silver at the Olympic Games – Beijing 2008).

Career
Galiazzo started to shoot at the age of thirteen, together with his father, who later became his coach. His first win was at Italian Youth Games (Giochi della Gioventù), at the age of fourteen. At sixteen he was chosen for the first time for the Italian national archery team. His first team was the Compagnia Arcieri Padovani with whom he trained when he won the Olympic medal.  Currently he is a member of A.S.D. Archers Rio.

On 19 August 2004 he won the gold medal in the men's individual at the Athens Olympic Games, beating the Japanese archer Hiroshi Yamamoto in the final round. In the second round he beat teammate Ilario Di Buò.

On 3 February 2006 he entered in the C.S. Aeronautica Militare.

On 18 April 2008 in Porec, Croatia, during the second leg of the Meteksan World Cup, he established the new Italian team record with Mauro Nespoli and Ilario Di Buò. On 11 August of the same year, together with Mauro Nespoli and Ilario Di Buò he won the silver medal in team competition at Olympic Games – Beijing 2008, losing in the final against South Korea. Two days later he was defeated 109–110 in the second round of the individual competition against Alan Wills (ENG), losing the opportunity to retain the Olympic title won four years earlier.

On 28 July 2012 he won the gold medal at Olympic Games in London in the team competition, together with Michele Frangilli and Mauro Nespoli, beating the United States in the final.

2004 Summer Olympics
Galiazzo competed at the 2004 Summer Olympics in men's individual archery.  He won his first three elimination matches, advancing to the quarterfinals.  In the quarterfinals, Galiazzo faced Vic Wunderle of the United States, defeating Wunderle 109–108 in the 12-arrow match and advancing to the semifinals.  There, he faced Laurence Godfrey of Great Britain, defeating Godfrey 110–108.  Galiazzo then competed against Hiroshi Yamamoto of Japan in the gold medal match, winning 111–109 to earn the gold medal. He was also a member of the 7th-place Italian men's archery team at the 2004 Summer Olympics.

References

External links
 
 

1983 births
Living people
Italian male archers
Olympic archers of Italy
Archers at the 2004 Summer Olympics
Archers at the 2008 Summer Olympics
Archers at the 2012 Summer Olympics
Archers at the 2016 Summer Olympics
Olympic gold medalists for Italy
Olympic silver medalists for Italy
Olympic medalists in archery
Medalists at the 2012 Summer Olympics
Medalists at the 2008 Summer Olympics
Medalists at the 2004 Summer Olympics
World Archery Championships medalists
Mediterranean Games gold medalists for Italy
Mediterranean Games medalists in archery
Competitors at the 2005 Mediterranean Games
Archers at the 2019 European Games
European Games medalists in archery
European Games bronze medalists for Italy
Archers of Centro Sportivo Aeronautica Militare
21st-century Italian people